Jan Christoph Plefka (born 31 January 1968 in Hanau) is a German theoretical physicist working in the field of quantum field theory and string theory.

Education
After receiving the Abitur in Darmstadt and performing civil service in a hospital, Plefka studied physics at the Technical University of Darmstadt and Texas A&M University where he received his M.Sc. as a Fulbright Scholar. He received his PhD from the Leibniz University Hannover with a dissertation on supersymmetric Matrix Models in 1995. In 2003 he received the Habilitation at the Humboldt University Berlin.

Career
After postdoctoral work at the City College New York and Nikhef Amsterdam, he became a Junior Staff Member at the Albert Einstein Institute, Max Planck Institute for Gravitational Physics in 1998.
In 2006, Plefka was awarded a Lichtenberg Professorship of the Volkswagen Foundation in quantum field and string theory at the Institute of Physics at Humboldt University Berlin, becoming Full Professor there in 2011. In 2014 he held a Visiting Professorship at the Institute for Theoretical Physics at the ETH Zurich. His research focuses on theoretical high energy and gravitational physics, in particular the AdS/CFT correspondence and hidden symmetries in quantum field theory.  His most influential work is the discovery of a hidden Yangian symmetry of scattering amplitudes in N=4 supersymmetric gauge theory together with Drummond and Henn 

. He has co-authored a text book on scattering amplitudes in gauge theories which is the first topical book on
modern on-shell techniques for scattering amplitudes.

References

Selected further publications

External links 
 Interview in journal HU-WISSEN Edition 6, December 2013 jointly with Matthias Staudacher.
 Jan Plefka at Humboldt University
 Interview on PodCampus HU
  

21st-century German physicists
Living people
Texas A&M University alumni
Theoretical physicists
1968 births
Technische Universität Darmstadt alumni
Studienstiftung alumni